Valediction is the 11th book in Robert B. Parker's Spenser series and first published in 1984.

Spenser, a private investigator in Boston, who served as an infantryman in the 1st Infantry Division during the Korean War and as a former State trooper, investigates the kidnapping of a young dancer by a religious sect.

References

1984 American novels
Spenser (novel series)
Novels about religion
Novels about kidnapping